Alena Dimitrievna Tiron, née Alena Bogacheva; born 8 December 1993) is a Russian female rugby union and rugby sevens player which represents Russia in World Rugby Women's Sevens Series and Rugby Europe Women's Sevens.

Biography

Rugby player career 
Alena came to rugby from track and field while having silver and bronze medals of 2012 Russia Championship in relay (400+300+200+100 and 800+400+200+100 respectively). She declined the invitation to rugby union from Yenisey-STM manager in 2011, but two years later, in March 2013 after graduating from sports school she moved to Krasnoyarsk and began training. On 1 May 2013 she became the player of Yenisey-STM after offer from a coach Maxim Zaltsman. She graduated from Siberian Federal University and won silver medal of III Russian Summer Youth Spartakiade.

She made her debut in Russia sevens national team in the end of 2013 before 2013 Dubai Women's Sevens, but did not take part in the competition due to heel injury. In January 2014 she joined the training and became the main squad player. Her debut was on the very next World Rugby Women's Sevens tournament. She is a five-time European Grand Prix winner: in 2014 she played all matches without substitutions and won her first gold medal. Due to serious injury she withdrawn from 2016 Rugby World Women's Sevens Olympic Repechage Tournament, where Russia has lost the final place at the Olympic tournament to Spain women's national rugby sevens team.

In 2017 Alena was nominated for the DHL Impact Player award. At the end of 2017–18 season she had 84 caps and 366 points (including 70 tries) and after 2018–19 season she reached 120 caps and 451 points (87 tries and 8 conversions).

Achievements 
 Rugby Europe Women's Sevens champion: 2014, 2016, 2017, 2018, 2019, 2021
 Rugby Europe Women's Sevens runner-up: 2015
 2015 Dubai Women's Sevens All-Star team player
 DHL Impact Player
 2017 Dubai Women's Sevens DHL Impact Player
 2018 Japan Women's Sevens DHL Impact Player
 Rugby Europe Women's Championship bronze medalist: 2016
 2017–18 World Rugby Women's Sevens Series DHL Impact Player

Personal life 
Alena's mother has a degree in Mathematics.

Alena was married to Alexey Mikhaltsov, a Russian rugby player. On 12 October 2019, Alena married Ilya Tiron, RC Moscow Torpedo and Russia national team video analyst player. Alena's bright appearance (hairstyle and pigtails) is well known in rugby world.

References

Sources 
 

1991 births
Living people
Russia international rugby union players
Russian female rugby sevens players
Yenisey-STM Krasnoyarsk players
Olympic rugby sevens players of Russia
Rugby sevens players at the 2020 Summer Olympics